Expo 2012 Yeosu Korea was an International Exposition recognised by the Bureau International des Expositions (BIE) held in Yeosu, South Korea which opened May 12, 2012 and ran until August 12, 2012. The theme of the Expo was "The Living Ocean and Coast" with subthemes of "Preservation and Sustainable Development of the Ocean and Coast", "New Resources Technology", and "Creative Marine Activities". There were 105 participating countries, international organizations, and 8,203,956 visitors.

The Expo 2012 Yeosu opened on May 12 in the southern coastal town of Yeosu, approximately 455 kilometers south of Seoul. It was the second international fair hosted by Korea, after the Taejŏn Expo '93.

The expo site for 80 exhibition halls stretched out alongside the sea with promenades and exhibit spaces extending to the island of Odongdo and the seawalls.

The Yeosu Expo also received positive reaction for addressing global issues like climate change and the protection of the ocean through story-telling events.

Outline 
 Title (English) World Exposition Yeosu Korea 2012, EXPO2012 YEOSU KOREA
 Title (Korean) 2012 여수 세계 박람회 / 2012 麗水 世界 博覽會
 The chairman of the Organizing Committee Kang Dong-Suk
 Theme 'The Living Ocean and Coast'
 Theme Song 'Stories told by the sea (by IU)'
 Mascot Yeony, Suny
 Venue  New Port Area 1,740,000 m2 Yeosu city, Jeollanam-do (South Jeolla Province) in Korea – Exhibition area 250,000 m2
 Date May 12, 2012 ~ August 12, 2012 (93 days)
 Opened by President Lee Myung-bak
 Facilities Theme Pavilion, International Pavilion, International Organizations Pavilion, Sky Tower, etc.
 Ripple Effect (expected) The expected economic effect will be 12.2 trillion Korea won in production, 5.7 trillion Korea won in added value and 79,000 employees.
 Expected participation scale 8,000,000 people, 100 countries and 10 international organizations
 International Exposition Yeosu Korea 2012 Official Participants As of October 23, 2011, 103 countries, 8 international organizations

Mascot and symbol 
Mascot

Yeony and Suny, the official mascots of Expo 2012 Yeosu Korea, are personifications of plankton. Each of their names is derived from "Yeosu", where Yeo means "beautiful" and Su means "water".

Emblem

A simplified abstraction of the organic forms of ecology, oceans and environment are represented in the logo.

Selection process 

To host, a venue must receive over 2/3 of the votes cast by BIE member countries in the first round of voting. At each round of voting, the venue with the fewest votes is out and there is an additional vote between the remaining venues.

Theme, vision, and goals

Theme
The Living Ocean and Coast: Diversity of Resources and Sustainable Development

Background of theme
The Expo theme aimed to help shed light on humankind's knowledge and advancement of technology concerning the ocean and coast and identify ways to resolve challenges facing the ocean. Since the United Nations Convention on the Law of the Sea went into effect in 1993, the ocean has emerged as an important element in resolving various problems humankind faces, including those related to resources, food, space and the environment. However, industrial activities have damaged the marine ecosystem and subsequently reduced fish stocks. As a result, the ocean faces severe crisis. A damaged marine ecosystem, global warming and natural disasters are not limited to a certain country or region, but are issues that have global implications.

Subthemes 

The theme, "The Living Ocean and Coast", was divided into three sub-themes: Development and Preservation of the Ocean and Coast, New Resources Technology, and Creative Marine Activities. These sub-themes have been further developed into 6 thematic groups, namely, Climate & Environment, Marine Life, Marine Industry & Technology, Marine City and Marine Civilization, and Marine Arts, each of which are  demonstrated in their respective sub-theme pavilions.

Development and Preservation of the Ocean and Coast aimed to inspire a new level of cooperation in the international community so as to combat climate change and create a paradigm where development and preservation find a better balance. The last few decades have witnessed environmental degradation caused by use and development of natural resources by humankind. Our economies and societies must break away from their current fossil fuel-based economies to minimize damage to both people and the environment. The sub theme argued that individuals, businesses, countries and the global community must realize that marine resources are limited and should not be subject to careless use, but that they are the fundamentals for the sound development of our future society, and people and ecosystems must be considered on the same level.

New Resources Technology illustrated the progress and future prospects of marine technology, a new growth driver for the advancement of humankind. Countries are becoming more competitive in marine-related industries and are developing new technologies to address issues related to resources and the changing environment. The discreet use of resources, which strikes a balance between development and preservation, is only possible if based on advanced marine science and technology. Fostering marine industries will create added value and generate new jobs to transform sluggish industries into low cost, high efficiency structures.

Creative Maritime Activities aimed to demonstrate the relationship between the oceans and humankind through culture and art and promote the new ideals of the seatizen and seavilization. A mix of play and experience (edutainment) aimed to trigger the imagination and curiosity of attendees towards an unknown world and to inspire children to learn to love and appreciate the oceans. A wide collection of marine-related culture and arts, including poetry, novels, films, operas, musicals, plays and music were shown at the Yeosu Expo.

Primary content

Korean Pavilion
The Korean Pavilion was designed to convey the theme of Expo 2012 Yeosu Korea, whilst also emphasizing Korea's vision and role.

The exhibition hall was adorned with traditional Korean constructions and colors. The event organizers have also stated that a diverse selection of official events and "event corners", representing Korean culture, will be prepared for the international occasion.

An exhibition that has been highlighted in the lead-up to the event was one that will feature the most notable achievements in Korean shipbuilding, marine transportation, marine products, marine technology, and marine safety. These achievements are shown in two exhibition halls.

The first exhibition hall Sea of Miracles focused on Korea's past ocean adventures. and was divided into three acts: Experiencing Korea's Seas, Discovering Korea's Maritime Spirit and - Realizing Korea's Maritime Capacity.

The second hall 2 Sea of Hope portrayed Korea's potential future role in maritime era and included the world's largest dome screen.

International Pavilions

It was anticipated that the International Pavilions section will occupy the exhibition space's largest physical area. This section of the Expo provided an opportunity for participating countries to plan and hold their exhibitions. Themed quarters were displayed in the International Pavilions exhibition, consisting of the "Sea of Life", "Sea of Exchange", "Sea of Peace", and "Sea of Land". There were total of four buildings (A, B, C, and D) each with several exhibition rooms for participating countries.

Other participating nations had displays in shared pavilions, with Oceania in A introducing different countries within Oceania; Pacific in B introducing different countries within Pacific Ocean and Indian Ocean in C showing different countries within Indian Ocean.

Theme Pavilion
The core concept of the Expo was "The Living Ocean and Coast". Human life not only embraces space, time, culture, science, technology, and occidental and oriental ideas, but also the ecosystems and humankind. In the tradition of previous expos (Zaragoza Expo's "Water", Lisbon Expo's "Sea", and "Future heritage"), the organizers of Expo 2012 Yeosu Korea have expressed an intention to innovate and progress beyond the concepts of the event's history.

Aquarium, the Marine Life Pavilion
Based upon the notion that marine life is the source of all life, the exhibition sought to present the diversity of the earth's marine resources, as well as the viability of their continuous use and development by humankind.
Visitors observe the sea as a "treasure house" of biodiversity and, by highlighting our mutual relationship with the sea, the importance of preserving the marine environment is emphasized. The aquarium built in Expo 2012 is so far Korea's largest aquarium. It houses more than over 34,000 marine animals of 281 species and is divided into three main areas: Marine Life, Aqua Forest, and Ocean Life.

Marine Life
This area mostly shows marine animals that live in coastal regions.
Animals such as belugas, Baikal seals, penguins, otters, sea lions and elephant seals live here.

Aqua Forest
One unexpected feature in the aquarium is the presence of artificially made Amazon Jungle.
Although it does not completely mimic the actual jungle, it houses over 100 species of tropical creatures.

Ocean Life
The last area has astonishing 360 view of the aquarium water tank.
As visitors walk through the tunnel made up of transparent and durable materials, they can view the marine animals swimming above them.
Unlike Marine Life area, it has over 200 species of marine animals, including huge sharks, rays, sardines, sea turtles and jellyfish from different oceans of the world.
Other than wondrous marine organisms, there is a 3-D movie theater that shows short animation clip as well. Although aquarium is free-of-charge, 3-D movie costs money to watch it. At one time, aquarium can only allow 1,620 people inside and takes 60 minutes on average to fully view it.

Expo Digital Gallery
One structure in Expo 2012 was the Expo Digital Gallery. Located between the international pavilions it was a gigantic LED screen attached at the bottom of the ceiling. It is a rectangular LED screen 218 meters wide and 30 meters long. This is equivalent to 6,324 units of 60 inch TVs. When pedestrians walked under the huge screen, they were able to see various animations played within the LED screen. Visitors with smartphones were able to take a picture, add a message, and send it to the screen so that it can be displayed on the screen.

Sky Tower
Two cement storage towers were transformed into the tallest structure of the Expo site and its observation deck offers panoramic views of the event grounds. It includes the acoustical signet of the Expo: The Vox Maris, a pipe organ that opened and closed every single Expo-day, it was also regularly used in concert play. Inside Sky Tower a new Korean technique produces fresh water from sea water and a panoramic cinema shows scenes of ocean life. The Sky Tower was elected as one of the top four major attractions of Yeosu Expo.

Expo Town
The Expo Town was originally developed as an exemplary model of an ecologically-sound coastal city, for use as a testing ground for "green" home projects. The organizers modified this section to display ocean-themed "timeshares" and premium dwelling places for the future beyond the Expo.

Yeosu Declaration
Yeosu Declaration is to demand the international response to the situation such as pollution and overfishing, that preservation for the ocean and sustainable development is threatened. It emphasized the importance of international cooperation and feasible actions for solving problems in ocean. Yeosu Declaration was  chosen during the Expo and supported by the international society which seeks sustainable development.

Yeosu Project
Under the Yeosu Project, the government of South Korea had planned to spend around $10 million to fund educational programs in developing countries and to fund the visit of professionals from developing countries to South Korea. This training and education was planned to focus on the protection of marine ecosystems and on sustainable development.

Performances
Other than pavilions and exhibition buildings, Yeosu Expo held various indoor and outdoor performances to further entertain its visitors. Such performances involved water shows, parades, concerts involving pop stars from other countries, movies, and theatricals. For each event, the location varies and has meaningful messages to portray to the audiences. Some are performed multiple times while others are performed once. These diverse events not only allow the visitors to enjoy their time to the fullest but also allow them to realize the reasons for holding Yeosu Expo 2012.

Water shows
The Big-O Show: The Big-O show designed by ECA2 and WET Design was the main performance on water and it intended to be one of the must-watch performances in Yeosu Expo 2012. The show was not performed by people but rather by a gigantic donut-shaped machine capable of igniting explosive fires, spraying seawater, and shining lights of different colors at many directions. The machine is 120 meters wide and has 345 water nozzles. In addition, there are numerous small water fountains at the bottom that shot seawater upwards to more than 70 meters. The hollow circle in the middle of the machine is used to display the animated video. Instead of using a projector with a screen, the machine used holograms generated by the machine and water falling from top of the machine as the screen. Special effects such as the lights, water, and fire changed to match the mood of the video. The plot of the video involved a female protagonist exploring the sea. The main themes were peace, cooperation, and hope, and the video attempts to explain how sea is the origin of all life, how humans are polluting it for their own benefits, and what people can do in order to conserve it. The Big-O show was held once in the evening from Sunday to Thursday and twice on Friday and Saturday evenings. With few screenings and large demand, many people were waiting to see it. There are multiple security measures as well because there weren't enough seats.

Events 
 Kang Dong-suk, Chairman of the Organizing Committee for Expo 2012 Yeosu Korea visited the participating nations (October 6, 2010)
 Large-scale field lodging facility village established near Yeosu (October 6, 2010)
 61 countries confirmed their participation (August 3, 2010)
 The seminar "New Sea and Green Economy" held by the Organizing Committee for Expo 2012 Yeosu Korea (July 22, 2010)
 The celebration for D-2 years held in Shanghai (May 17, 2010)

See also 
 International Exposition
 Taejŏn Expo '93

References

Notes

External links 

  
Official website of the BIE
 European Patent Office
 ExpoMuseum's Expo 2012 Page 
 

2012 in Asia
2012 in South Korea
South Korea
Yeosu